Peter Howard Rheinstein (born September 7, 1943) is an American physician, lawyer, author, and administrator (both private and governmental).  He was an official of the Food and Drug Administration (FDA) 1974-1999.

Education
Rheinstein, a General Motors Scholar, received a B.A. with high honors from Michigan State University in 1963, an M.S. in mathematics from Michigan State University in 1964, an M.D. from Johns Hopkins University in 1967, and a J.D. from the University of Maryland School of Law in 1973. At Michigan State University Rheinstein was noted for his facility in mathematics.

Food and Drug Administration
Rheinstein was director of the Drug Advertising and Labeling Division, Food and Drug Administration, Rockville, 1974-1982; he was acting deputy director Office of Drugs, 1982–83, acting director Office of Drugs; 1983–84, director Office of Drug Standards, 1984–90, director medicine staff Office Health Affairs, 1990-99. While at FDA Rheinstein developed precedents for Food and Drug Administration regulation of prescription drug promotion, initiated FDA’s first patient medication information program; implemented the Drug Price Competition and Patent Term Restoration Act of 1984, and authored medication goals for Healthy People 2000 and 2010. Judy Woodruff interviewed Rheinstein about generic drug safety on the McNeil-Lehrer NewsHour, 11 Dec 1985. Stone Phillips interviewed Rheinstein about drug labeling on Dateline NBC, March 31, 1992.

Later career
From 1999 – 2004, Rheinstein was senior vice president for medical and clinical affairs, Cell Works, Inc., Baltimore. Among other projects, Cell Works wanted to develop a blood test for anthrax, similar to a system for cancer cells it produced. "It's something that companies like ours can incorporate into our diagnostic technology," Rheinstein told the Washington Times. Biodefense projects "create new technologies, the spin-offs of which can be commercialized into some pretty good things." In 2000 Rheinstein became president of Severn Health Solutions in Severna Park, Maryland. In 2010 Rheinstein was named president of the Academy of Physicians in Clinical Research  and in 2011 was named chairman of the American Board of Legal Medicine. Rheinstein was named chairman of the United States Adopted Names Council in 2012. Rheinstein is a member of Phi Kappa Phi, and vice-president of the Intercultural Friends Foundation. Rheinstein is publisher of Discovery Medicine and chairman of MedData Foundation. He is president-elect of the Academy of Medicine of Washington, DC. Sarah Gonzalez interviewed Rheinstein for Planet Money, This is Your Brain on Drug Ads, 8 Sept 2021.

Publications
Co-author: Human Organ Transplantation: Societal, Medical-Legal, Regulatory, and Reimbursement Issues. Health Administration Press, Ann Arbor, Michigan 1987.
special editorial advisor, Good Housekeeping Guide to Medicines and Drugs, 1977–80
member editorial board Legal Aspects Medical Practice, 1981–89
member editorial board Drug Information Journal, 1982–86
publisher of Discovery Medicine, 2001-

External links
Peter Rheinstein on Avvo.com
Peter Rheinstein's biography from Who's Who in America
Peter Rheinstein's recent AMA House of Delegate Articles 
Peter Rheinstein publications on Google Scholar
Peter Rheinstein publications on Google Books
Peter Rheinstein publications on PubMed
Judy Woodruff interviews Peter Rheinstein about generic drug safety on the McNeil-Lehrer NewsHour, 11 Dec 1985
Stone Phillips interviews Peter Rheinstein about drug labeling, Dateline NBC, March 31, 1992
Sarah Gonzalez interviews Peter Rheinstein for Planet Money, This is Your Brain on Drug Ads, 8 Sept 2021
Peter Rheinstein. House drug bill dooms medical research. Detroit News 20 Nov 2019
Peter Rheinstein. Research protections will beat crises like COVID-19. Columbus Dispatch 11 Aug 2020
FHS student completes summer science course. Farmington Enterprise 8 Sept 1960
Peter Rheinstein's biography from American Men & Women of Science: A Biographical Directory of Today’s Leaders in Physical, Biological and Related Sciences(Vol. 12. 36th ed. 2018)

References

1943 births
Living people
American public health doctors
Michigan State University alumni
University of Maryland Francis King Carey School of Law alumni
Johns Hopkins University alumni
American lawyers
Drug safety
American pharmacologists
Food and Drug Administration people
Johns Hopkins School of Medicine alumni